Thomas Bulkeley may refer to:

Thomas Bulkeley (died 1593), politician
Thomas Bulkeley, 1st Viscount Bulkeley (1585–1659), landowner from North Wales who supported the Royalist cause
Thomas Bulkeley (died 1708) (1633–1708), MP for Beaumaris, Anglesey, Caernarvonshire and Caernarvon Boroughs
Thomas Bulkeley, 7th Viscount Bulkeley (1752–1822), MP for Anglesey 1774–1784
Thomas Bulkeley (19th century MP), see Windsor